Testulea is a monotypic genus of plants in the family Ochnaceae. The sole species is Testulea gabonensis. It is found in Cameroon, the Republic of the Congo, Equatorial Guinea, and Gabon. It is threatened by habitat loss.

References

Ochnaceae
Monotypic Malpighiales genera
Endangered plants
Taxa named by François Pellegrin
Taxonomy articles created by Polbot